John Austen may refer to:
John Austen (illustrator) (1886–1948), English book illustrator
John Austen (died 1572), MP for Guildford
Sir John Austen, 2nd Baronet (c. 1640–1699), MP for Rye 1667–1679 and 1689– (Austen Baronets of Bexley, Kent)
Sir John Austen, 1st Baronet (died 1742), MP for Middlesex 1701–1702, 1709–1710 and 1722–1727 (Austen Baronets of Derehams, Middlesex)

See also
John Austin (disambiguation)